Sugoi Uriarte Marcos (born 14 May 1984) is a Spanish judoka who won a silver medal at the 2009 World Judo Championships. He competed at the 2012 and 2016 Olympics and reached semifinals in 2012.

Uriarte took up judo aged five. He is married to the fellow Olympics judoka Laura Gómez and is trained by her father. Uriarte has master's degrees in engineering and sport administration. His mother died shortly before the 2012 Olympics.

Notes

References

External links

 
 
 

Spanish male judoka
Sportspeople from Vitoria-Gasteiz
1984 births
Living people
Olympic judoka of Spain
Judoka at the 2012 Summer Olympics
Judoka at the 2016 Summer Olympics
Universiade medalists in judo
Mediterranean Games gold medalists for Spain
Mediterranean Games medalists in judo
Competitors at the 2013 Mediterranean Games
Universiade silver medalists for Spain
European Games competitors for Spain
Judoka at the 2015 European Games
Medalists at the 2007 Summer Universiade
20th-century Spanish people
21st-century Spanish people